Cymatura holonigra is a species of beetle in the family Cerambycidae. It was described by Stephan von Breuning in 1954. It is known from Tanzania and the Democratic Republic of the Congo.

Subspecies
 Cymatura holonigra holonigra Breuning, 1954
 Cymatura holonigra longipilis Teocchi, 1989

References

Xylorhizini
Beetles described in 1954